Love is a 1971 Hungarian drama film directed by Károly Makk. Based on two short stories by Tibor Déry, Szerelem (1956) and Két asszony (1962), it stars Lili Darvas and Mari Törőcsik. The film was selected as the Hungarian entry for the Best Foreign Language Film at the 44th Academy Awards, but was not accepted as a nominee.

Today, Love is considered a classic of world cinema by critics including Derek Malcolm and Roger Ebert. The film was selected for screening as part of the Cannes Classics section at the 2016 Cannes Film Festival. The film was chosen to be part of the New Budapest Twelve, a list of Hungarian films considered the best in 2000.

Cast
 Lili Darvas - Az öregasszony
 Mari Törőcsik - Luca
 Iván Darvas - János
 Erzsi Orsolya - Irén
 László Mensáros - Az orvos
 Tibor Bitskey - Feri (as Bitskei Tibor)
 András Ambrus - Börtönőr
 József Almási - Tanár
 Zoltán Bán - Borbély
 Éva Bányai - Feriék szolgálója
 Ágnes Dávid - Feriék szolgálója
 Mária Garamszegi - Feriék szolgálója
 Alíz Halda - Tanárnő
 Magda Horváth - Kissné
 Nóra Káldi - Az öregasszony fiatalon (as Káldy Nóra)

Historical background
In 1953 after the death of Soviet premier Joseph Stalin many arrested people were released in Hungary. In Love, Makk tells the story of a young Hungarian woman whose husband has been arrested by the secret police, and who eases his mother's last months with the tale that her son is in America.

Reception
Love won three prizes, including the Jury Prize at the 1971 Cannes Film Festival. It has also been acclaimed in recent years; Derek Malcolm ranked it one of The Guardian's 100 best films of the 20th century.

See also
 List of submissions to the 44th Academy Awards for Best Foreign Language Film
 List of Hungarian  submissions for the Academy Award for Best Foreign Language Film

References

External links
 
 

1971 films
Hungarian black-and-white films
1971 drama films
1970s Hungarian-language films
Films directed by Károly Makk
Films based on multiple works
Hungarian drama films